The 1994 UEFA European Under-21 Championship qualification began in 1992 and finished in early 1994.  The final tournament was held in March and April 1994 in France.

The 32 national teams were divided into six groups (four groups of 5 + two groups of 6). The group winners and the two best runners-up played off against each other on a two-legged home-and-away basis to determine the final four, one of whom would host the last four matches.

The team from Serbia and Montenegro, then known as the Federal Republic of Yugoslavia (founded in April 1992) were excluded from the tournament for political reasons. They had been drawn in group five. In the first competition since the dissolution of the Soviet Union, Russia competed. Wales also competed for the first time.

Albeit had been dissolved in 1992, Czechoslovakia still competed for this time.

Qualifying group stage

Draw
The allocation of teams into qualifying groups was based on that of 1994 FIFA World Cup qualification with several changes, reflecting the absence of some nations:
 Group 1 did not include Estonia
 Groups 2 and 6 featured the same nations
 Group 3 did not include Northern Ireland, Lithuania and Latvia, but included Germany (who did not participate in World Cup qualification)
 Group 4 did not include Faroe Islands
 Group 5 featured the same nations. As in the World Cup qualifiers, Yugoslavia was excluded from the group after the draw

Group 1

Group 2

 qualify as group winners

Group 3

 qualify as group winners

Group 4

 qualify as group winners

Group 5
 was excluded due to Yugoslav war.

 qualify as group winners qualify as a "best runner-up"

Group 6

 qualify as group winners

Ranking of second-placed teams
Because groups contained different number or teams (six and five), matches against the fifth- and sixth-placed teams in each group are not included in the ranking. As a result, six matches played by each team counted for the purposes of the second-placed table. The top seven advanced to the play-off.

See also
1994 UEFA European Under-21 Championship

1994 UEFA European Under-21 Championship
Qual
UEFA European Under-21 Championship qualification